is a Japanese retired sprinter. He qualified for the 1980 Japan Olympic team but did not compete due to the 1980 Summer Olympics boycott. He was the gold medallist in the 200 metres and 4 × 100 metres relay at the 1981 Asian Championships and the first Japanese to run under 21 seconds with electronic timing in the 200 metres.

Personal bests
100 metres – 10.41 (1982)
200 metres – 20.81 (1982) - Former national record

International competitions

National titles
Japanese Championships
100 m: 1977, 1979
200 m: 1977, 1979, 1980, 1982

References

1956 births
Living people
Sportspeople from Kumamoto Prefecture
People from Hitoyoshi, Kumamoto
Japanese male sprinters
Asian Games silver medalists for Japan
Asian Games bronze medalists for Japan
Asian Games medalists in athletics (track and field)
Athletes (track and field) at the 1982 Asian Games
Medalists at the 1982 Asian Games
Japan Championships in Athletics winners
20th-century Japanese people